Lasmigona costata, the flutedshell, is a species of freshwater mussel. It is an aquatic bivalve mollusk in the family Unionidae.

References

costata
Molluscs of North America
Fauna of the Great Lakes region (North America)